Light Upon the Lake is the debut studio album by American rock band Whitney, released on June 3, 2016 on Secretly Canadian.

Background and recording
The album is Max Kakacek and Julien Ehrlich's first release since the breakup of their previous band, Smith Westerns, for which Kakacek was the guitarist and Ehrlich was the drummer. Ehrlich was also formerly the drummer of the band Unknown Mortal Orchestra.

Light Upon the Lake was written during the winter in the band's hometown of Chicago, Illinois and was recorded in the San Fernando Valley in California with Foxygen member Jonathan Rado, who also produced the album along with the band. The band joined Rado at his home in Los Angeles and slept in tents in his backyard.

Release
The album was preceded by the singles "No Woman," "Golden Days," and "No Matter Where We Go". Each single was released alongside a music video. "No Woman" was later featured in the 2018/19 video game Life Is Strange 2.

Critical reception

Light Upon the Lake received wide acclaim from contemporary music critics. At Metacritic, which assigns a normalized rating out of 100 to reviews from mainstream critics, the album received an average score of 83, based on 18 reviews, which indicates "universal acclaim".

Nikki Volpicelli of Paste praised the album, stating, "Sure, literally speaking all of the songs off of Light Upon the Lake conjure up failure to maintain a relationship with a loved one, but how can you relate a new band’s debut record—and one that’s so so fully realized to the point of even having a mission statement in the Whitney, as a man, as a writing prompt and concept—with a break up? If anything, it’s the start of something new." Matthew Schnipper of Pitchfork gave the album a favorable review, stating, "Whitney might not reinvent anything, but they sound perfect right now, and it’s hard to argue with being in the right place at the right time."

Michael Hann of The Guardian gave the album a favorable review, stating, "Those with a low tolerance for winsome male falsettos may wish to steer clear, but anyone who loves the strain of American pop that began when the Byrds started branching out in 1966 and 1967 should rush to hear this delightful confection." Matt Wilkinson of NME praised the album, stating, "Bass, horns, strings, organ and choir provide the backbone, and when Whitney allow themselves to kick it up a gear and really let rip, as on ‘Golden Days’ (with its cathartic “Na na na” outro) or the George Harrison-meets-The Band magnificence of ‘Dave’s Song’, they’re untouchable."

Accolades

Track listing

Personnel
Credits adapted from the liner notes of Light Upon the Lake.

 Julien Ehrlich – performer
 Max Kakacek – performer
 Charles Glanders – performer
 Josiah Marshall – performer
 Malcolm Brown – performer
 Tracy Chouteau – performer
 Will Miller – performer
 Jonathan Rado – additional performer
 Macie Stewart – additional performer
 Myra Hinrichs – additional performer
 Ziyad Asrar – additional performer

Production
 Whitney – production, mixing (1)
 Jonathan Rado – production
 Daniel J. Goodwin – mixing (4, 6, 9)
 Jacob Portrait – mixing (1-3, 5, 7, 8, 10)
 Miles Johnson – art direction, design
 Sandy Kim – photography

References

2016 debut albums
Secretly Canadian albums
Albums produced by Jonathan Rado